South Riana is a rural locality and town in the local government area of Central Coast, in the North West region of Tasmania. The 2016 census determined a population of 214 for the state suburb of South Riana.

History
The locality was gazetted in 1966.

Geography
The Blythe River forms part of the western boundary.

Road infrastructure
The B17 route (Pine Road) enters from the north-east and runs through to the south as South Riana Road before exiting. Route C115 (a continuation of South Riana Road) starts at an intersection with B17 and runs west before exiting.

References

Localities of Central Coast Council (Tasmania)
Towns in Tasmania